Vintage Dead is a live album by the rock group the Grateful Dead. It was recorded at the Avalon Ballroom in San Francisco, California, in late 1966 (thought to be September 16, 1966), and released in October 1970.

Vintage Dead was produced without the approval or cooperation of the Grateful Dead. However, it is a legal recording, not a bootleg. A label called Together Records assembled live recordings of various Bay Area bands for a planned anthology. When the imprint collapsed, MGM paid the remaining debt and assumed the tapes, releasing two albums of Grateful Dead material on their Sunflower Records subsidiary. The first, Vintage Dead, reached number 127 on the Billboard 200. Produced as a vinyl LP and long out of print, it has not been released as a Compact Disc.

Vintage Dead was then followed by Historic Dead, another Sunflower Records album recorded at the Avalon in 1966 and released under similar circumstances.

Track listing
Side one
"I Know You Rider" (traditional) – 4:25 
"It Hurts Me Too" (Elmore James) – 4:17
"It's All Over Now, Baby Blue" (Bob Dylan) – 4:50
"Dancing in the Street" (Marvin Gaye, Ivy Jo Hunter, and William "Mickey" Stevenson) – 7:55
Side two
"In the Midnight Hour" (Steve Cropper and Wilson Pickett) – 18:23
Notes

Personnel
Grateful Dead
Jerry Garcia – lead guitar, vocals
Bill Kreutzmann – drums
Phil Lesh – bass guitar, vocals
Ron "Pigpen" McKernan – organ, harmonica, vocals
Bob Weir – rhythm guitar, vocals

Technical personnel
Robert Cohen – production and engineering
Richard Delvy – editing and remixing
Kelley/Mouse Studios – poster design
John Pierce and Mokelvey – front cover and design

References

1970 live albums
Covers albums
Grateful Dead live albums
Sunflower Records live albums
Live blues rock albums